Vasilios Zarkadis was a Greek fencer and footballer. He won a bronze medal in football as part of the Greek team at the 1906 Intercalated Games.

References

Year of birth missing
Year of death missing
Greek male fencers
Greek footballers
Olympic fencers of Greece
Olympic footballers of Greece
Fencers at the 1920 Summer Olympics
Footballers at the 1906 Intercalated Games
Olympic bronze medalists for Greece
Association football forwards